Beswick may refer to:
Beswick (surname)
Beswick, East Riding of Yorkshire
Beswick, Manchester
Beswick, Northern Territory, Australia, former name of Wugularr
Beswick Creek, Northern Territory, Australia, former name of Barunga

See also
Beswick Pottery in Staffordshire, England
Beswick v Beswick, a 1967 landmark case in English contract law
Bradford-with-Beswick, Manchester